The 2005–06 Skeleton World Cup took place from September 2005 to February 2006 parallel with the bobsleigh Europe Cup and America's Cup competitions.

Calendar

October
October 31 to November 6 Lake Placid, New York, United States (AC)
America's Cup Competition
Men's & Women's Bobsleigh
Men's & Women's Skeleton

November
November 2 - November 8 Igls, AUT    
Skeleton School
            
November 5 - November 12 Calgary, CAN (WC)
World Cup Competition

November 10 – November 12 Igls, AUT (EC)
Europe Cup Competition
Men's &  Women's Skeleton

November 12 - November 19 Park City, United States (AC)
America's Cup Competition
Men's & Women's Bobsleigh
Men's & Women's Skeleton

November 14 – November 19 Igls, AUT
Bobsleigh  School

November 14 – November 20 Lake Placid, New York, United States (WC)
World Cup Competition
Men's & Women's Bobsleigh
Men's & Women's Skeleton

November 20 - November 26 Calgary, CAN (AC)
America's Cup Competition
Men's & Women's Bobsleigh
Men's & Women's Skeleton

November 21 – November 27 Igls, AUT (EC)
Europe Cup Competition
Men's & Women's Bobsleigh

November 24 – November 25 Cesana/Turin, Italy, (Trng.)
Men's & Women's Skeleton
         
November 25 – November 29 Cesana/Turin, Italy, (Trng.)
International Training Week
Men's & Women's Skeleton

December
December 5 – December 11 Igls, AUT, (WC)
World Cup Competition
Men's & Women's Bobsleigh
Men's & Women's Skeleton

December 5 – December 11 Königssee, GER (EC)
Europe Cup Competition
Men's & Women's Bobsleigh
Men's & Women's Skeleton

December 12 – December 18 Cortina d'Ampezzo Italy (WC)
World Cup Competition
Men's & Women's Bobsleigh
        
December 12 – December 18 Altenberg, GER (EC)
Europe Cup Competition
Men's & Women's Bobsleigh
Men's & Women's Skeleton

December 11 – December 15 Sigulda, LAT (WC)
World Cup Competition
Men's & Women's Skeleton

January
January 9 – January 15 Königssee, GER, (WC)
World Cup Competition
Men's & Women's Bobsleigh
Men's & Women's Skeleton

January 9 – January 15 Cortina d'Ampezzo, Italy (EC)
Europe Cup Competition
Men's Bobsleigh
            
January 16 – January 22 Königssee, GER ( Chall.)
Challenge Cup for Europe
Men's Bobsleigh-

January 16 – January 22 Königssee, GER (Chall.)
Challenge Cup for America
Men's Bobsleigh

January 16 – January 22 St.Moritz, SUI (WC/ECh)
World Cup Competition
European Championships
Men's & Women's Bobsleigh
Men's & Women's Skeleton

January 18 – January 22 Königssee, GER (Chall)
Challenge Cup
Men's & Women's Skeleton

January 23 – January 29 St.Moritz, SUI (EC)
Europe Cup Competition
Men's & Women's Bobsleigh
Men's & Women's Skeleton

January 23 – January 29 Altenberg, GER (WC)
World Cup Competition
Men's & Women's Bobsleigh
Men's & Women's Skeleton

January 30 – February 5 Igls, AUT (JWC)
Junior World Championships
Men's & Women's Bobsleigh
Men's & Women's Skeleton

February
February 6 – February 12 Winterberg, GER (EC)
Europe Cup Competition
Men's & Women's Bobsleigh
Men's & Women's Skeleton

February 10 – February 26 Turin/Cesana, Italy (OWG)
Olympic Winter Games

Signatures
WB = Women's Bobsleigh
MB = Men's Bobsleigh
WS = Women's Skeleton
MS = Men's Skeleton
Tr = Official Training
Tr = Training upon payment
Co = Skeleton competition
2m = 2-man Bobsleigh competition
2w = Women's Bobsleigh competition
4m = 4-man Bobsleigh competition
XX = Two-man bobsleigh
XXXX = Four-man bobsleigh
EC = Europe Cup Competition
AC = America's  Cup Competition
CCh. = Continental Championships
ECh. = European Championship
JWC = Junior World Bobsleigh Championships
WCh = World Championships

References
List of 2005-06 results

Skeleton World Cup
2005 in skeleton
2006 in skeleton